Petr Korda defeated Richard Krajicek in the final, 7–6(8–6), 6–2, 6–4 to win the singles tennis title at the 1997 Eurocard Open.

Boris Becker was the defending champion, but was defeated by Krajicek in the second round.

Seeds
A champion seed is indicated in bold text while text in italics indicates the round in which that seed was eliminated. All sixteen seeds received a bye into the second round.

  Pete Sampras (third round)
  Michael Chang (second round)
  Patrick Rafter (semifinals)
  Goran Ivanišević (second round)
  Greg Rusedski (second round)
  Carlos Moyá (second round)
  Yevgeny Kafelnikov (third round)
  Sergi Bruguera (second round)
  Marcelo Ríos (quarterfinals)
  Álex Corretja (second round)
  Gustavo Kuerten (third round)
  Thomas Muster (second round)
  Jonas Björkman (semifinals)
  Félix Mantilla (second round)
  Petr Korda (champion)
  Richard Krajicek (final)

Draw

Finals

Top half

Section 1

Section 2

Bottom half

Section 3

Section 4

External links
 Main draw

Singles